Prądy may refer to the following places:
Prądy, Opole Voivodeship (south-west Poland)
Prądy, Pomeranian Voivodeship (north Poland)
Prądy, Silesian Voivodeship (south Poland)